Telecommunications equipment (also telecoms equipment or communications equipment) are hardware which are used for the purposes of telecommunications. Since the 1990s the boundary between telecoms equipment and IT hardware has become blurred as a result of the growth of the internet and its increasing role in the transfer of telecoms data.

Types
Telecommunications equipment can be broadly broken down into the following categories:

Public switching equipment
Analogue switches
Digital switches
Voice over IP switches
Virtual reality (VR)
Transmission equipment
Transmission lines
Optical fiber
Local loops
Base transceiver stations
Free-space optical communication
Laser communication in space
Multiplexers
Communications satellites
Customer premises equipment (CPE)
Customer office terminal
Private switches
Local area networks (LANs)
Modems
Mobile phones
Landline telephones
Answering machines
Teleprinters
Fax machines
Pagers
Routers
Wireless devices

Semiconductors
Most of the essential elements of modern telecommunication are built from MOSFETs (metal–oxide–semiconductor field-effect transistors), including mobile devices, transceivers, base station modules, routers, RF power amplifiers, microprocessors, memory chips, and telecommunication circuits. As of 2005, telecommunications equipment account for 16.5% of the annual microprocessor market.

Vendors
The world's largest telecommunications equipment vendors by revenues in 2017 are:

See also
Networking hardware
List of networking hardware vendors
List of telephone switches
Network equipment provider

References